
Year 141 BC was a year of the pre-Julian Roman calendar. At the time it was known as the Year of the Consulship of Caepio and Pompeius (or, less frequently, year 613 Ab urbe condita). The denomination 141 BC for this year has been used since the early medieval period, when the Anno Domini calendar era became the prevalent method in Europe for naming years.

Events

By place

Syria and Judea 
 The Seleucid garrison negotiates the surrender of Jerusalem. Simon Maccabaeus assumes control of the city. He becomes prince (ruler) of Judea until 135 BC.
 Demetrius II of Syria made prisoner of Mithridates, king of the Parthians. Antiochus VII Sidetes becomes king of the Seleucid Empire in his absence.

Bactria 
 Yuezhi refugees appear on the borders of the Greco-Bactrian kingdom.

China 
 March 9 – Emperor Wu of Han ("Martial Emperor") starts to rule the Han Dynasty.

Births 
 Salome Alexandra, queen and regent of Judea (d. 67 BC)

Deaths 
 Jing of Han, Chinese emperor of the Han Dynasty (b. 188 BC)
 Publius Cornelius Scipio Nasica Corculum, Roman statesman

References